Choreutis diana, Diana's choreutis moth, is a moth of the family Choreutidae. It is found in northern North America and most of Europe. It was first described by the German entomologist, Jacob Hübner in 1819.

Description
The wingspan is 14–18 mm.

In Canada, adults have been recorded from mid-April to mid-May, in June and from July to September. In the UK, adults are on wing in July and August. Adults have been found visiting thistle flowers.

The larvae feed on red alder (Alnus rubra), grey alder (Alnus incana), paper birch (Betula papyrifera),  balsam poplar (Populus balsamifera), willow (Salix species) and cherry (Prunus species). It is a solitary leafroller, found under a silken web on the upper surface of a leaf of the host plant. The frass is caught in the web. Larvae have been recorded from mid-June to late July in North America.

Distribution
Found in northern North America and most of Europe, in Britain it is only known from only one site; Glen Affric, in the Highland region of Scotland.

References

External links
mothphotographersgroup
Bug Guide

Choreutis
Moths described in 1822
Moths of Japan
Moths of Europe
Moths of  North America
Taxa named by Jacob Hübner